Michael D. Smith is the John H. Finley, Jr. Professor of Engineering and Applied Sciences in the Harvard John A. Paulson School of Engineering and Applied Sciences. He is also a Harvard University Distinguished Service Professor and served as the Dean of the Faculty of Arts and Sciences at Harvard University from 2007 to 2018. In addition to his academic position, Smith was the Chief Scientist and co-founder of Liquid Machines, Inc., a provider of enterprise rights management software.

Education
Smith received his bachelor's degree in electrical engineering and computer science from Princeton University in 1983, his MS from Worcester Polytechnic Institute in 1985, and his PhD in electrical engineering from Stanford University in 1993.

References

American computer scientists
John A. Paulson School of Engineering and Applied Sciences faculty
Living people
Stanford University School of Engineering alumni
Princeton University School of Engineering and Applied Science alumni
Worcester Polytechnic Institute alumni
Year of birth missing (living people)